Live at the Troubadour is a live album by Carole King and James Taylor released in 2010. The album was recorded at The Troubadour in West Hollywood in November 2007 to celebrate the venue's 50th anniversary. It was also the first venue that King and Taylor played together in November 1970.

King and Taylor also mounted the Troubadour Reunion Tour in Australia, New Zealand, Japan and North America during 2010.

The album debuted at #4 in the United States with first-week sales of 78,000. This gives James Taylor a top 10 album in every decade since the 1970s and Carole King her first top 10 album since 1976.

Live at the Troubadour has sold over 606,000 copies in the United States.

Track listing
"Blossom" (James Taylor) 3:09
"So Far Away" (Carole King) 4:41
"Machine Gun Kelly" (Danny Kortchmar) 2:59
"Carolina in My Mind" (Taylor) 4:16
"It's Too Late" (King, Toni Stern) 4:59
"Smackwater Jack" (Gerry Goffin, King) 5:25
"Something in the Way She Moves" (Taylor) 4:04
"Will You Love Me Tomorrow" (Goffin, King) 4:12
"Country Road" (Taylor) 3:49
"Fire and Rain" (Taylor) 5:44
"Sweet Baby James" (Taylor) 3:34
"I Feel the Earth Move" (King) 4:05
"You've Got a Friend" (King) 5:51
"Up on the Roof" (Goffin, King) 4:09
"You Can Close Your Eyes" (Taylor) 2:49

Personnel
 Carole King – vocals, piano
 James Taylor – vocals, guitar, harmonica
 Danny Kortchmar – guitar
 Leland Sklar – bass guitar
 Russ Kunkel – drums

Charts

Year-end charts

Certifications

References

Carole King live albums
James Taylor live albums
2010 live albums
Albums produced by Peter Asher
Albums recorded at the Troubadour